Honey Popcorn (Hangul: 허니팝콘) is a girl group based in South Korea formed by Kyun Create, consisting of Yua Mikami, Moko Sakura, Ruka Tajima, and Sara Izumi. The group debuted on March 21, 2018 with album Bibidi Babidi Boo.

History
In February 2018, Yua Mikami announced that she would debut in South Korea with a new girl group with Miko Matsuda and Moko Sakura. Prior to this, all three girls had worked as idol singers in Japan, with Mikami as a member of SKE48, Matsuda as a member of NMB48, and Sakura as a member of Bakusute Sotokanda Icchome (a sub-unit of Akihabara Backstage Pass). The group was funded by Mikami herself as a passion project. Their debut was met with controversy by South Korean media outlets due to the members being adult film actresses. On December 23, 2018, Miko Matsuda announced on her Twitter that she will be graduating from the group. In June 2019, Nako Miyase, Ruka Tajima and Sara Izumi joined the group. In December 2020, Nako Miyase left the group.

Discography

Extended plays

Singles

References

K-pop music groups
South Korean girl groups
South Korean dance music groups
Musical groups from Seoul
Musical groups established in 2018
2018 establishments in South Korea
South Korean pop music groups